Jiayuanli Station, formerly Guojiuchang Station, is a station of Line 1 of the Tianjin Metro. It started operations on 12 June 2006.

References

Railway stations in Tianjin
Railway stations in China opened in 2006
Tianjin Metro stations